Wilhelm Henneberg (10 September 1825 – 22 November 1890) was a German chemist and student of Justus von Liebig.

Life 
He attended the Collegium Carolinum in Brunswick and studied at the University of Giessen with Justus von Liebig and at the University of Jena where he received his Ph.D in 1849. It was under the influence of Liebig that Henneberg decided to devote his career to agricultural chemistry.

In 1852 he became secretary of the Königlich Hannoverschen Landwirtschaftsgesellschaft (Royal Hanoverian Agricultural Society) in Celle, and in 1857 was named director of the newly established agricultural experiment station in Weende-Göttingen. In 1865 he became an associate professor, and in 1873, a full professor at the University of Göttingen.

At the Weende agricultural station, with Friedrich Stohmann, he developed a proximate system for routine analysis of animal feed that is now referred to as the "Weende analysis". With Stohmann, he was co-author of Beiträge zur Begründung einer rationellen Fütterung der Wiederkäuer (Contributions to the rational feeding of ruminants).

External links and references 
 Biography from a school in Weende
 Institute for Animal Nutrition and Animal Physiology in Goettingen

Specific

1825 births
1890 deaths
19th-century German chemists
University of Giessen alumni
University of Jena alumni
Academic staff of the University of Göttingen
Technical University of Braunschweig alumni
19th-century agronomists
People from Wernigerode